Jeremiah McLain Rusk (June 17, 1830November 21, 1893) was an American Republican politician.  He was the 2nd United States Secretary of Agriculture (1889–1893) and the 15th Governor of Wisconsin (1882–1889), and served three terms in the United States House of Representatives (1871–1877), representing northwest Wisconsin.  He also served as a Union Army officer during the American Civil War, served one term in the Wisconsin State Assembly (1862), and was the last Bank Comptroller of Wisconsin (1866–1870) before the office was abolished.

Biography

Rusk was born in Malta, Ohio, the younger brother of Allen Rusk. He was a member of the Republican Party. He began as a planter, then turned to innkeeping and finally to banking before the American Civil War.

Rusk started his service with the Union Army during Civil War as major of the 25th Wisconsin Volunteer Infantry Regiment on August 14, 1862. He was promoted to lieutenant colonel on September 16, 1863. He took command of the regiment on July 22, 1864 when Colonel Milton Montgomery was wounded and captured at Decatur, Georgia during the Battle of Atlanta. He continued in command after Montgomery was exchanged because Montgomery was given command of the brigade to which the 25th Wisconsin Infantry was assigned. Rusk was wounded at Salkehatchie River, Georgia on January 20, 1865. Rusk was mustered out of the volunteers on June 7, 1865. He received an appointment as brevet colonel to rank from March 13, 1865. On February 24, 1866, President Andrew Johnson nominated Rusk for appointment to the grade of brevet brigadier general of volunteers to rank from March 13, 1865, and the United States Senate confirmed the appointment on April 10, 1866.

After the Civil War, he became a congressman in the United States House of Representatives. He was elected to the Forty-second United States Congress as the representative of Wisconsin's 6th congressional district serving from March 4, 1871 to March 3, 1873. For the Forty-third Congress he redistricted and was elected as representative of Wisconsin's newly created 7th District. He was reelected to the Forty-fourth Congress as well serving from March 4, 1873 to March 3, 1877. While in congress, he was chairman of Committee on Invalid Pensions (Forty-third congress). After his terms in congress he ran as a Republican for Governor of Wisconsin, an election he won. His most noted act during his governorship was when he sent the National Guard into Milwaukee to keep the peace during the May Day Labor Strikes of 1886. The strikers had shut down every business in the city except the North Chicago Rolling Mills in Bay View. The guardsmen's orders were that, if the strikers were to enter the Mills, they should shoot to kill. But when the captain received the order it had a different meaning: he ordered his men to pick out a man and shoot to kill when the order was given. This led to the Bay View Tragedy, in which a number of workers were killed; Governor Rusk took most of the blame.

In 1889, after the end of his third term as governor, he accepted the new cabinet position of Secretary of Agriculture in the Benjamin Harrison administration. He lived, died and was buried in Viroqua, Wisconsin. Rusk County, Wisconsin was named after Rusk. It was originally Gates County but changed its name in 1905.

The house he bought and lived in while Governor of Wisconsin, now known as the Old Executive Mansion, was used by the state as the official residence of the Governor for several decades and is listed on the National Register of Historic Places. His son, Lycurgus J. Rusk, was a member of the Wisconsin State Assembly.

See also

List of American Civil War brevet generals (Union)

References

External links

 
 Retrieved on 2008-02-12

|-

|-

|-

|-

1830 births
1893 deaths
People from Malta, Ohio
Union Army officers
Republican Party governors of Wisconsin
United States Secretaries of Agriculture
People of Wisconsin in the American Civil War
Farmers from Wisconsin
Republican Party members of the Wisconsin State Assembly
American planters
People from Viroqua, Wisconsin
Benjamin Harrison administration cabinet members
Republican Party members of the United States House of Representatives from Wisconsin
19th-century American politicians
Burials in Wisconsin